Pác Nặm is a rural district of Bắc Kạn province in the Northeast region of Vietnam. As of 2003 the district had a population of 26,476. The district covers an area of 474 km². The district capital lies at Bộc Bố.

Administrative divisions
The district is subdivided to 10 rural communes:
 Bằng Thành
 Nhạn Môn
 Công Bằng
 Giáo Hiệu
 Bộc Bố
 Xuân La
 Cổ Linh
 An Thắng
 Cao Tân
 Nghiên Loan

References

External links

Districts of Bắc Kạn province